Gildo Rizzato (born 2 February 1948) is an Italian former footballer who played as a forward.

Career 
Rizzato played at the youth level with A.C. Montagnana. In 1964, he played with A.C. Legnano, and the following season with S.P.A.L. He returned to Legnano in 1966, and had another stint with SPAL in the Serie A in 1967. In 1968, he played in the Serie B with SPAL, and in 1969 he played in the Serie C with Empoli F.C. He played in the Serie D with U.S. Triestina Calcio 1918, and assisted in securing promotion by winning the league title.

In the summer of 1973 he played abroad in the National Soccer League with Toronto Italia. In late 1973, he played with A.S.D. Sangiovannese 1927, and later played with A.S.D. Nuovo Monselice Calcio.

Managerial career 
Rizzato became the president for Abano Calcio in 1991, and in 2019 he was named the honorary president for the club.

Personal life  
In 1987, he founded GR Bike a company that markets cycle sport.

References 

Living people
1948 births
Association football forwards
A.C. Legnano players
S.P.A.L. players
Empoli F.C. players
U.S. Triestina Calcio 1918 players
Toronto Italia players
A.S.D. Sangiovannese 1927 players
Serie A players
Serie B players
Serie C players
Serie D players
Canadian National Soccer League players
Sportspeople from Padua
Italian footballers
Italian expatriate footballers
Expatriate soccer players in Canada
Italian expatriate sportspeople in Canada
Footballers from Veneto
People from Montagnana